Vendetta  ( Vendetta) is an Armenian romantic drama television series. The series premiered on Shant TV on July 25, 2016.
Most of the series takes place in Yerevan, Armenia.

References

External links
 
 

Armenian-language television shows
Armenian drama television series
2016 Armenian television series debuts
2010s Armenian television series
Shant TV original programming